The glass tax was introduced in Great Britain in 1746, during the reign of King George II. Originally, these acts taxed initially raw materials used for glass making. Glass was at that time sold by weight, and manufacturers responded by producing smaller, more highly decorated objects, often with hollow stems, known today as "Excise glasses". The impact of these taxes was that many glassworks had to move their businesses to bordering countries, most frequently to Ireland. In 1780, the government granted Ireland free trade in glass without taxation, resulting in the establishment of glassworks in Cork and Waterford. After the campaigns against those acts, glass tax was shifted in 1811 to all products made from glass, for examples green glass bottles, windows and flint glass. The heavy decorative glass objects and large windows became the symbol of wealth in this time period. This also meant that only the very wealthy could afford green houses and the fruit grown in them. In 1825 the excise on glass were amended again, including raw materials as well as rising the taxation rates on finished glass goods.

Gradually the industry declined, until the glass tax was abolished by Sir Robert Peel's government in 1845.

A contemporary account in the medical journal The Lancet described the glass tax as an "absurd impost on light":

References

Citations

Bibliography

History of glass
History of taxation in the United Kingdom
Taxation in Ireland
Abolished taxes